The Kpong Dam, also known as the Akuse Dam, is a hydroelectric power generating dam on the lower Volta River near Akuse
in Ghana. It is owned and operated by Volta River Authority. It was constructed between 1977 and 1982.

The project supplements power production from Akosombo Dam, for the smelting of aluminium at VALCO in Tema.

Because the reservoir upstream of the dam is relatively small, the plant operates as a "run-of-the-river" project, with river flow controlled at Akosombo. The civil contractor for the project was Impregilo of Italy. Other components of the project include a 161 kV switchyard and transmission lines, four villages constructed to house people displaced by the project, and road construction.

In addition to power generation, the project provides irrigation water for agriculture, and municipal water supply. Bilharzia is a health hazard in the region which has increased since the construction of the dam.

See also

 List of power stations in Ghana
 Electricity sector in Ghana

References

Dams in Ghana
Dams on the Volta River
Hydroelectric power stations in Ghana
Dams completed in 1982
Volta River Authority
Run-of-the-river power stations
Energy infrastructure completed in 1982
Rock-filled dams
1982 establishments in Ghana